is a Japanese middle-distance and long-distance runner. He competed in the 10,000 metres event at the 2015 World Championships in Athletics in Beijing, China. His twin brother, Kota, competed in the 5000m. In 2018 he finished the marathons in Gold Coast with a personal best and Berlin, where he missed a record.

International competitions

Personal bests

References

External links
 
 

1993 births
Living people
Japanese male long-distance runners
Japanese male middle-distance runners
World Athletics Championships athletes for Japan
Place of birth missing (living people)
Komazawa University alumni
Sendai University Meisei High School alumni
Japanese twins
Twin sportspeople
Competitors at the 2013 Summer Universiade
21st-century Japanese people